Robert "Bob" Woods (born September 2, 1933 in Canada) is a Canadian-Swedish curler.

He introduced the long slide in Swedish curling in the 1960s.

Teams

Mixed

References

External links
 
Curling, Etcetera: A Whole Bunch of Stuff About the Roaring Game - Google Books (page 17)

Living people
1933 births
Curlers from Toronto
Swedish male curlers
Swedish curling champions
Canadian expatriate sportspeople in Sweden